McArthur Binion (born 1946) is an American artist based in Chicago, Illinois. Binion was born in Macon, Mississippi. He holds a BFA from Wayne State University (1971) in Detroit, Michigan and an MFA from Cranbrook Academy of Art in Bloomfield Hills, Michigan. He was a Professor of Art at Columbia College in Chicago from 1993-2015.

Early life
McArthur Binion was born on September 1, 1946 on a cotton farm in Macon, Mississippi to Russell Earl Binion and Martha Binion in a family of 11 children. In 1951, his family moved to Detroit.

Career
Binion received his BFA from Wayne State University, Detroit, in 1971, and his MFA from the Cranbook Academy of Art, Bloomfield Hills, MI, in 1973.  In 1973, he moved to New York, where Binion worked amidst and befriended many other artists of the era working in the city, such as Jean Michel-Basquiat and Sol Lewitt. The same year he moved to New York, Binion was selected for a group show at Artists Space, the non-profit organization's second exhibition co-curated by Mr. Lewitt and Carl Andre. Binion's paintings have since appeared in the Contemporary Arts Museum Houston, the Studio Museum in New York, and the Detroit Institute of Art. In 1991, Binion moved to Chicago, where he took a position as Professor of Art at Columbia College in 1993. Though he worked continuously during that period, he exhibited his work infrequently until Chicago dealer Kavi Gupta began representing him in 2013. Binion was represented by Kavi Gupta and Galerie Lelong & Co. until he joined Lehmann Maupin and Massimo De Carlo galleries in 2018. In 2017, Binion was included the Christine Macel's curated VIVA ARTE VIVA for the 57th Venice Biennale, where his paintings from his DNA series received notable mention. A 2019 front page article in The New York Times recognized him, and others, as among a "generation of African-American artists in their 70s and 80s who are enjoying a market renaissance after decades of indifference."

Work
McArthur Binion's work primarily consists of minimalist abstract paintings, created using crayons, oil stick, and ink, often on rigid surfaces such as wood or aluminum. For many years, Binion has been incorporating laser-prints as a collaged ground on top of which he applies other mediums.  Binion says that what he takes away from minimalism in his creative process is “that you want to do your own stuff in your own image.” His work has been compared to Dorothea Rockburne, Robert Mangold, Robert Ryman and Jasper Johns’s “The Dutch Wives” paintings at times.

Binion identifies as a "Rural Modernist," and says that his work "begins at the crossroads—at the intersection of Bebop improvisation and Abstract Expressionism.”  His work is influenced by modernist artists such as Kasimir Severinovich Malevich, Piet Mondrian, and Wifredo Lam. He is considered "expressionistic, grided abstract paintings have garnered significant (albeit long-overdue) attention."

In his most recent exhibition (the DNA Study series), Binion's paintings aren’t fully abstract, but attempt to talk about the black experience and his personal history at the same time. Acting as a kind of template for gridded marks in black, white and occasionally brightly colored oil-paint-stick layered on top, are pages from Binion's 1970's handwritten phone books, passport ID and negatives of his birth certificate.

Selected exhibitions

2019: Ghost: Rhythms & Haints, Mississippi Museum of Art, Jackson, MS
2018: Binion/Saarinen: The McArthur Binion Project, Cranbrook Art Museum, Bloomfield Hills, MI
2017: VIVA ARTE VIVA, 57th Venice Biennale
2012: Perspectives 177: McArthur Binion, Contemporary Arts Museum Houston, Houston, TX

Gallery representation 
McArthur Binion is represented by Lehmann Maupin, New York, Hong Kong and Seoul; Massimo De Carlo, Milan, London, and Hong Kong; and Richard Gray Gallery, Chicago.

References

External links
 McArthur Binion: DNA Study
McArthur Binion: Ghost: Rhythms

Living people
1946 births
African-American contemporary artists
American contemporary artists
American contemporary painters
People from Macon, Mississippi
African-American painters
21st-century African-American people
20th-century African-American people